Ghoresha is a village in the Kharagauli district of Imereti region in western Georgia. It is known for being the birthplace of Sergo Ordzhonikidze, a leading Bolshevik and close ally of Joseph Stalin.

References
 Georgian Soviet Encyclopedia Vol. 10, p. 596, 1986.

Geography of Georgia (country)
Populated places in Kharagauli Municipality